Marcia Gay Harden is an American actress who has received numerous accolades throughout her career, including an Academy Award, a Tony Award and three nominations at the Primetime Emmy Awards.

Her performance as artist Lee Krasner in the 2000 film Pollock received critical acclaim, earning her the Academy Award for Best Supporting Actress. In 2003, she starred in the Clint Eastwood-directed thriller Mystic River as Celeste, a woman who suspects her husband of being a murderer. For this film, she was nominated for a second Academy Award, a Satellite Award, and a Screen Actors Guild Award. Her other notable film roles include American Gun (2005), that earned her a nomination for the Independent Spirit Award for Best Supporting Female, and 2007's The Mist and Into the Wild, winning a Saturn Award for Best Supporting Actress for the former and being nominated for a Screen Actors Guild Award for Outstanding Performance by a Cast in a Motion Picture for the latter.

Harden made her Broadway debut in 1993, starring in Angels in America, for which she was nominated for a Tony Award for Best Featured Actress in a Play. She returned to the stage in 2009 as Veronica in God of Carnage. Her performance won her the Tony Award for Best Actress in a Play. Her television work includes a supporting role in The Courageous Heart of Irena Sendler (2009),  for which she was nominated for a Primetime Emmy Award for Outstanding Supporting Actress in a Limited Series or Movie.

Awards and nominations

Notes

References

External links 
 

Harden, Marcia Gay